Ludger Pistor (born 16 March 1959) is a German actor.

Career
Born in Recklinghausen, Pistor has played many roles in numerous German-language films and TV productions. He has also appeared in English-language films including the Academy Award-winning Schindler's List and the 2006 James Bond film Casino Royale as the Swiss banker Mendel.

Filmography

References

External links

Official Homepage

1959 births
Living people
People from Herten
German male film actors
German male television actors
20th-century German male actors
21st-century German male actors
People from Recklinghausen